Bubber (born Niels Christian Meyer) is a Danish television host born in December 1964. He is one of Denmark's most recognized TV hosts, and has hosted several shows. Bubber has won Årets Otto 2005

References

External links 

1964 births
Living people